Akebia chingshuiensis is a member of the Akebia family native to China. It is a rarer species of Akebia and has a smaller range than Akebia trifoliata or Akebia quinata.

Description 
Akebia chingshuiensis is a subspecies of Akebia trifoliata from China and has been used in traditional Chinese medicine for over 2000 years.

References 

Lardizabalaceae
Plants described in 1961
Plants used in traditional Chinese medicine